Anne Fine OBE FRSL (born 7 December 1947) is an English writer. Although best known for children's books, she also writes for adults. She is a Fellow of the Royal Society of Literature and she was appointed an OBE in 2003.

Fine has written more than seventy children's books, including two winners of the annual Carnegie Medal and three highly commended runners-up. For some of those five books she also won the Guardian Prize, one Smarties Prize, two Whitbread Awards, and she was twice the Children's Author of the Year.

For her contribution as a children's writer, Fine was a runner-up for the Hans Christian Andersen Medal in 1998. From 2001 to 2003, she was the second Children's Laureate in the UK.

Early life
Fine was born and raised in Leicester and educated in neighbouring midland counties of England. She attended Northampton High School and earned a degree in politics from the University of Warwick. She was married to the philosopher Kit Fine until they were divorced; she has now been with her partner Dick Warren for more than twenty years. She currently lives in Barnard Castle, County Durham, England. She and Kit Fine have two daughters named Cordelia Fine and Ione Fine.

She has four sisters; her father was an electrical engineer and she grew up in Fareham, Hampshire. The eldest of the sisters is Elizabeth Arnold who also writes books for children; the three younger sisters were triplets. She studied History and Politics at university, got married, and then her daughter Ione was born. At age 24, she wrote her first book.

Career
Describing the start of her writing career, Fine has written: “In 1971 my first daughter was born. Unable to get to the library in a snowstorm to change my library books, in desperation I sat down and started to write a novel. Clearly this was the right job for me, for I have never stopped writing for more than a few weeks since”. In September 2010, Fine told The Daily Telegraph’s Jessica Salter that this first book lay under her bed after being rejected by two publishers, adding “Five years later I unearthed it and entered it in a competition where I was runner-up, and it was finally published in 1978”.

Her books for older children include Madame Doubtfire (1987), a satirical novel
that Twentieth Century Fox filmed as Mrs. Doubtfire, starring Robin Williams. Goggle-Eyes (Hamish Hamilton, 1989) was adapted for television by Deborah Hall for the BBC.

Her books for middle children include Bill's New Frock (Methuen, 1989) and How to Write Really Badly (1996).

Her work has been translated into 45 languages.

In March 2014, Fine lent her support to the campaign Let Books Be Books, which aims to persuade publishers of children's books to stop labelling and promoting books as "for boys" or "for girls". She told UK newspaper The Guardian: "You'd think this battle would have been won decades ago. But even some seemingly bright and observant adults are buying into it again […] There are girls of all sorts, with all interests, and boys of all sorts with all interests. Just meeting a few children should make that obvious enough. But no, these idiotic notions are spouted so often they become a self-fulfilling societal straitjacket from which all our children suffer".

Awards and nominations

The biennial Hans Christian Andersen Award conferred by the International Board on Books for Young People is the highest recognition available to a writer or illustrator of children's books. In 1998, Fine was one of five finalists for the writing award.

She won the 1989 Carnegie Medal from the Library Association, recognising Goggle-Eyes as that year's best children's book, and she was one of two highly commended runners-up for the same Medal with Bill's New Frock. She also won the once-in-a-lifetime Guardian Prize for Goggle-Eyes and the Smarties Prize in ages category 6–8 years for Bill's New Frock.

Three years later, she won the Carnegie Medal again for Flour Babies (Hamilton, 1992), which was also named the Whitbread Children's Book of the Year.
The Tulip Touch (Hamilton, 1996) was her second Whitbread winner and her second highly commended for the Carnegie.

Up on Cloud Nine (Doubleday, 2002) was the last highly commended Carnegie runner-up, a distinction then used 29 times in 24 years. Fine is one of seven authors to win two Carnegie Medals (1936–2012) and the only author of three Highly Commended books.

Fine was the second Children's Laureate (2001–03) and received the OBE for services to literature in the 2003 Queen's Birthday Honours List.

Awards
 1989 Carnegie Medal – Goggle-Eyes
 1990 Guardian Children's Fiction Prize – Goggle-Eyes
 1990 Nestlé Smarties Book Prize, ages 6–8 – Bill's New Frock
 1990 Children's Author of the Year Award, Publishing News
 1991 Children's Author of the Year, British Book Awards
 1992 Carnegie Medal – Flour Babies
 1993 Whitbread Award, Children's Book – Flour Babies
 1993 Children's Author of the Year Award, Publishing News
 1994 Children's Author of the Year, British Book Awards
 1996 Whitbread Award, Children's Book – The Tulip Touch
 1998 Prix Sorcières, best children's book translated into French – Journal d'un chat assassin (Diary of a Killer Cat)

Runners-up, nominations, etc.
 1984 Guardian shortlist – The Granny Project
 1987 Guardian shortlist – Madame Doubtfire
 1987 Whitbread shortlist – Madame Doubtfire
 1989 Carnegie, highly commended – Bill's New Frock
 1993 Carnegie shortlist – The Angel of Nitshill Road
 1996 Carnegie, highly commended – Tulip Touch
 2002 Carnegie, highly commended – Up on Cloud Nine
 2004 shortlist for the Red House Children's Book Award, Younger Readers – The More The Merrier
 2006 Carnegie shortlist – The Road of Bones
 2007 Nestlé Smarties Book Prize, ages 6–8, second place – Ivan the Terrible
 2014 Carnegie shortlist - Blood Family

Selected works

Picture books
 Poor Monty (1991) 
 Ruggles (2001), illustrated by Ruth Brown
 Big Red Balloon (2012)
 Hole in the Road (2014)
 Under the Bed (2015)
.Como escribir realmente mal

For younger children
 Scaredy-Cat (1985) 
 Stranger Danger? (1989), illus. Jean Baylis 
 Only a Show (1990), illus. Valerie Littlewood
 The Worst Child I Ever Had (1991), illus. Clara Vullianny
 Design a Pram (1991), illus. P. Dupasquier
 The Same Old Story Every Year (1992), illus. Vanessa Julian-Ottie
 The Haunting of Pip Parker (1992) 
 Press Play (1994), illus. Terry McKenna
 The Diary of a Killer Cat (1994), illus. Steve Cox —in French translation, winner of the 1998 Prix Sorcières
 Care of Henry (1996), illus. Paul Howard
 Jennifer's Diary (1996), illus. Kate Aldous
 Countdown (1996), illus. David Higham
 Roll Over Roly (1999), illus. P. Dupasquier
 Notso Hotso (2001) 
 The Jamie and Angus Stories (2002), illus. Penny Dale
 A Shame to Miss 1: Perfect poems for young readers, selected by Anne Fine (2002)  —anthology
 How to Cross the Road and Not Turn into a Pizza (2002), illus. Tony Ross
 The Return of the Killer Cat (2003) 
 Nag Club (2004) 
 It Moved! (2006) 
 Jamie and Angus Together (2007), illus. Penny Dale
 The Killer Cat Strikes Back (2007)
 The Killer Cat's Birthday Bash (2008)
 Jamie and Angus Forever (2009), illus. Penny Dale
 Under a Silver Moon (2012)
 Out for the Count (2016)

For middle children
 Anneli the Art Hater (1986) 
 A Pack of Liars (1988) 
 Crummy Mummy and Me (1988), illus. David Higham
 A Sudden Puff of Glittering Smoke (1989)
 A Sudden Swirl of Icy Wind (1990)
 A Sudden Glow of Gold (1991)
The three "Sudden" books were reissued as one, Genie, Genie, Genie (2004) .
 The Country Pancake (1989), illus. Philippe Dupasquier – also published as Saving Miss Mirabelle
 Bill's New Frock (1989), illus. P. Dupasquier —winner of the Smarties Prize, ages 6–8
 The Chicken Gave It To Me (1992), illus. P. Dupasquier
 The Angel of Nitshill Road (1993), illus. P. Dupasquier
 How To Write Really Badly (1996), illus. P. Dupasquier
 Loudmouth Louis (1998), illus, Kate Aldous
 Charm School (1999), illus. Ros Asquith
 Telling Tales (Interview/Autobiography) (1999) 
 Bad Dreams (2000) 
 A Shame to Miss 2: Ideal poems for middle readers, selected by Anne Fine (2002)  —anthology
 The More the Merrier (2003) ; in the US, The True Story of Christmas
 Frozen Billy (2004) 
 Ivan the Terrible (2007) 
 Eating Things on Sticks (2010)
 Trouble in Toadpool (2012)
 On Planet Fruitcake (2013)

For older children
 The Summer-House Loon (Methuen, 1978) 
 The Other Darker Ned (1979) 
 The Stone Menagerie (1980) 
 Round Behind the Ice-House (1981) 
 The Granny Project (1983) 
 Madame Doubtfire (1987) ; in the US, Alias Madame Doubtfire
 Goggle-Eyes (1989) ; in the US, My War with Goggle-Eyes —winner of the Carnegie Medal and Guardian Prize
 The Book of the Banshee (1991) 
 Flour Babies (1992)  —winner of the Carnegie Medal and Whitbread Award
 Step by Wicked Step (1995) 
 The Tulip Touch (1996)  —winner of the Whitbread Award
 Very Different (2001)  —short story collection
 Up on Cloud Nine (2002) 
 A Shame to Miss 3: Irresistible poetry for young adults, selected by Anne Fine (2002)  —anthology
 On the Summerhouse Steps (2006)
 The Road of Bones (2006) 
 Fly in the Ointment (2008) 
 The Devil Walks (2011)
 Blood Family (2013) –shortlisted for the Carnegie Medal
 Blue Moon Day (2014) –short story collection
Shades of Scarlet (2021)

For adults
 The Killjoy (1986) 
 In Cold Domain (1994) 
 Taking the Devil's Advice (1990) 
 Telling Liddy (1998) 
 All Bones and Lies (2001) 
 Raking the Ashes (2005) 
 Our Precious Lulu (2009) 
 "Walk on Water, Walk on Air", Sunday Times, 18 January 2009 (online edition)

Notes

References

External links

 
 "My Home Library" program launch, by Fine as Children's Laureate
 
 
Interviews
 BBC Radio 4 Woman's Hour interview about Raking the Ashes on 11 April 2005.
 BBC Radio 4 interview about Raking the Ashes on 18 April 2005.
 Transcript of interview with Ramona Koval, The Book Show, ABC Radio National, 8 September 2008
 Interview with Anne Fine (Veronika Asks) on 13 November 2010
 Anne Fine at British Council: Literature: Writers

1947 births
Living people
English children's writers
British Book Award winners
Carnegie Medal in Literature winners
Costa Book Award winners
Guardian Children's Fiction Prize winners
Fellows of the Royal Society of Literature
Officers of the Order of the British Empire
Alumni of the University of Warwick
People from Leicester
People educated at Northampton High School, England
British Children's Laureate
20th-century English novelists
21st-century English novelists
20th-century English women writers
21st-century English women writers
British women children's writers
English women novelists